Bunshinsaba is a 2012 Chinese horror film directed by Ahn Byeong-ki." The film has the same title as Ahn Byeong-ki 2004 film Bunshinsaba, but contains an unrelated plot.  The film is set in Beijing, where Xiao Ai (Mei Ting) has her horror novel rejected by her patient publisher and finds out that her ex-husband, Qi Kun (Wu Chao), has been released from prison and is looking for her as well as her asthmatic son Xiao Xin (Zhu Jiangdi). Xiao Ai and Xiao Xin are offered an old house by her doctor where unexplainable events begin to happen.

Plot
A struggling novelist, Xiao Ai, has her horror novel rejected by her publisher. When her publisher notifies her that her husband, Qi Kun, who was imprisoned on charge of domestic abuse, has been released from prison, Xiao Ai decides to pack things up and move alongside her asthmatic son, Xiao Xin to a remote mansion owned by her friend and Xiao Xin's doctor, Yinan. Xiao Ai finds several cut-out photos of a girl and her mother inside a wardrobe, while Xiao Xin discovers a rag doll outside the mansion and takes an instant liking to it. Xiao Ai feels that ever since her son took the doll, the girl who is presumably the owner of the doll terrorizes her and makes Xiao Xin act unnatural, though he claims that the girl is afraid of her abusive mother. During one of her attempts to write a draft, Xiao Ai finds that a story has been written in her laptop, seemingly by no one, and which updates itself every day. The story matches the tale told by Xiao Xin: a girl who was abused by her mother after her father left them.

Despite repeated attempts to dispose of the doll, it always materializes back and returns to Xiao Xin's possession. The hauntings grow increasingly violent and malevolent, with Xiao Ai becoming even more paranoid and worried because of Xiao Xin's claims about the girl and her mother, until one day, Xiao Xin goes missing. Yinan calls the authorities to search for Xiao Xin. Xiao Ai also learns that the previous occupants of the mansion were a girl and her mother as per the story, and that the mother killed her daughter and herself when she could not take the pains of her husband leaving her. However, a rumor goes that the girl escaped the incident alive and was brought up in an orphanage. During the search, Qi Kun manages to reach the mansion and demands that Xiao Ai tells him the whereabouts of their son until Yinan stops him. Qi Kun informs Yinan that he had researched of Xiao Ai's background and learned that she was raised in an orphanage while being diagnosed with amnesia and asthma. Xiao Ai, meanwhile, sustains a head injury and is taken to the hospital by Yinan and Qi Kun, but along the way the car crashes off. Xiao Ai heads back to the mansion immediately.

At the mansion, Xiao Ai stumbles upon Qi Kun's research documents. It is revealed that the girl who haunts Xiao Ai is, in fact, Xiao Ai herself (albeit a younger version) and that Xiao Ai, deranged because of her own mother's abuses when she was young, is really the one who had abused Xiao Xin, but her bouts of amnesia meant that the only suspect of the abuses was Qi Kun, even though he only wanted to protect his son. She had also unknowingly wrote the story in her laptop, again because of her amnesia. Xiao Ai is led by her younger self to a secret room behind the wardrobe, where her mother hanged herself years before. She agrees to her younger self's demands to stay at the mansion in exchange for revealing where Xiao Xin is. After saving him, she attempts to escape the mansion but is almost strangled by her mother's spirit until she calls her "mother" for the first time since she never did it before, after which the spirit disappears.

Several months later, Xiao Ai has moved to the mansion permanently. She gives a monologue that her mother and son had taught her to understand her family, which led to her mother forgiving herself. A younger Xiao Ai is seen walking to the wardrobe where she is forcibly taken by her mother inside.

Cast
Mei Ting as Xiao Ai
 Ma Shuliang
 Wu Chao as Qi Kun
 Zhu Jiangdi as Xiao Xin
 Guo Jingfei as Yinan
 Gao Xinyu

Style
Derek Elley of Film Business Asia commented that outside the fact that the characters were speaking Mandarin, that the film "looks exactly like a South Korean one — from its clean-looking shooting style, photography, editing, music and even immaculate wardrobe — and with its remote setting could just as well have been shot in South Korea as well." The Chinese title of the film translates to a type of ouija board game using a pen, but no such item appears in the film.

Release
Bunshinsaba was released in China on July 12, 2012. The film grossed RMB32.0 million (US$5.01 million) in the first seven days of its theatrical run. Since the film's release, director  Ahn Byeong-ki has become the first South Korean director to set up his own workshop (ByungKi An China Studio) in Mainland China. The film ended its theatrical run grossing  RMB61 million (US$9.93 million). The film was followed up with a sequel  Bunshinsaba 2 in 2013 and Bunshinsaba 3 in 2014.

Sequels
 Bunshinsaba 2 (2013)
 Bunshinsaba 3 (2014)
 Bloody House (2016) aka Bunshinsaba: Then a Shadow (released before Bunshinsaba vs Sadako)

Unofficial crossovers
 Bunshinsaba vs Sadako (2016) (see: Ring (film) and Sadako 3D)
 Bunshinsaba vs Sadako 2 (2017) (see: Ring (film) and Sadako 3D)
 Sadako Wars: Bixian vs Kayako (2017) (also titled Bunshinsaba vs The Grudge, see: Ju-On franchise)
 Bunshinsaba vs Sadako 3 (unknown date)

See also
 Bunshinsaba (2004)

References

Films directed by Ahn Byeong-ki
Chinese horror films
Films set in Beijing
 Films set in country houses
2012 horror films
2012 films